Unending love is a poem by Rabindranath Tagore, originally written in Bengali and titled Ananta Prem. It expresses similar thoughts about eternal love to poet Kālidāsa's Shakuntala, and works by Shelley and Keats.

References

Poems by Rabindranath Tagore
Poems
Love poems